Ketugram Assembly constituency is an assembly constituency in Purba Bardhaman district in the Indian state of West Bengal.

Overview
As per orders of the Delimitation Commission No. 271 Ketugram assembly constituency covers  Ketugram I and Ketugram II blocks and  Koshigram and Srikhanda gram panchayats of Katwa I block.

Ketugram (SC) assembly constituency was earlier a part of Baharampur (Lok Sabha constituency). As per orders of the Delimitation Commission Ketugram assembly constituency is part of No. 41 Bolpur (Lok Sabha constituency).

Members of Legislative Assembly

Election results

2021

2016

2011

 

.# Swing calculated on Congress+Trinamool Congress vote percentages in 2006 taken together.

1977-2006
Tamal  Chandra Majhi of CPI(M) won the Ketugram (SC) assembly seat defeating Amar Ram of Congress in 2006 and 2001, and Narayan Chandra Poddar of Congress in 1996. Contests in most years were multi cornered but only winners and runners are being mentioned. Raicharan Majhi of CPI(M) defeated Chand Kumar Saha of BJP in 1991, Prabahakar Mandal of Congress in 1987, Lal Mohan Saha of Congress in 1982 and Prabhakar Mandal of Congress in 1977.

1951-1972
Prabakar Mondal of Congress won the Ketugram seat in 1972. Nirmal Chandra Mandal of CPI(M) won in 1971. Ramgati Mandal of CPI(M) won in 1969. P.Mandal of Congress won in 1967. Sree Mohan Thakur of CPI won in 1962. Ketugram had a joint seat in 1957. It was won by Sankar Dass and Abdus Sattar, both of Congress. In independent India's first election in 1951 Tarapada Bandopadhya  of Hindu Mahasabha won the Ketugram seat.

References

Assembly constituencies of West Bengal
Politics of Purba Bardhaman district